Franco Bianco Airport  is an airport  northwest of Cerro Sombrero, a petroleum production town in the Magallanes Region of Chile. Cerro Sombrero is near the eastern entrance to the Strait of Magellan.

See also

Transport in Chile
List of airports in Chile

References

External links
Franco Bianco Airport at OpenStreetMap
Franco Bianco Airport at OurAirports

Franco Bianco Airport at FallingRain

Airports in Tierra del Fuego Province, Chile